This list of Scottish Gaelic given names shows Scottish Gaelic given names beside their English language equivalent. In some cases, the equivalent can be a cognate, in other cases it may be an Anglicised spelling derived from the Gaelic name, or in other cases it can be an etymologically unrelated name.

Feminine names

A

B

C

D

E, È

F

G

Innes

M

O

P

R

S

T

U, Ù

Masculine names

A

B

C

D

E

F

G

H

I

L

M

N

O

P

R

S

T

U, Ù

See also
List of Irish-language given names

References

Footnotes

Bibliography

External links

Scottish Gaelic given names